The 2016 Asian Qualification Tournament for Rio Olympic Games was held from April 16 to 17, 2016 at the Marriot Convention Center Grand Ballroom in Pasay, Metro Manila, Philippines. The top two athletes from each weight division qualified for the Olympics. 98 athletes from 36 Asian countries entered the qualification tournament.

4 million pesos approved budget by the Philippine Sports Commission was spent by the Philippine Taekwando Association for the hosting rights and event preparations.

Medalists

Men

Women

Qualification summary

Results

Men

−58 kg
17 April

−68 kg
17 April

−80 kg
16 April

+80 kg
16 April

Women

−49 kg
16 April

−57 kg
17 April

−67 kg
17 April

+67 kg
16 April

See also
2016 Asian Taekwondo Championships

References

External links
2016 Asian Taekwondo Olympic Qualification Tournament Results - Day 1. World Taekwondo Federation

Asian Olympic Qualification
Taekwondo Olympic Qualification
Taekwondo Olympic Qualification
Taekwondo qualification for the 2016 Summer Olympics